Sydorenko is a Ukrainian-language patronymic surname, Сидоренко,  meaning "descendant of Sydir":

 Denys Sydorenko (born 1989), Ukrainian footballer
 Kyrylo Sydorenko (born 1985), Ukrainian footballer
 Kseniya Sydorenko (born 1986), Ukrainian synchronized swimmer
 Nataliya Sydorenko Tobias (born 1980), Ukrainian athlete
 Oleksandr Sydorenko (born 1960), Ukrainian swimmer
 Olena Sydorenko (born 1974), Ukrainian volleyball player
 Victor Sydorenko (born 1953), Ukrainian painter
 Valeriy Sydorenko (born 1976), Ukrainian boxer
 Volodymyr Sydorenko (born 1976), Ukrainian boxer

See also
 
 Sidorenko

Ukrainian-language surnames
Surnames of Ukrainian origin
Patronymic surnames